Yun Daek (born 22 September 1940) is a South Korean wrestler. He competed in the men's freestyle featherweight at the 1964 Summer Olympics.

References

1940 births
Living people
South Korean male sport wrestlers
Olympic wrestlers of South Korea
Wrestlers at the 1964 Summer Olympics
Place of birth missing (living people)
20th-century South Korean people